Thaumastocyoninae is an extinct subfamily of amphicyonids, large terrestrial carnivores, which inhabited what is now Europe during the Miocene epoch. The subfamily was erected by Hürzeler (1940), and is defined by the complete suppression of m1 metaconid, reduction of the premolars, except the p4, which is reinforced, and the oblique abrasion of the teeth, and the possession of hypercarnivorous tendencies. Thaumastocyonines are poorly known, with only about 65 dental specimens, most of those isolated teeth, being known as of 2020, although more complete remains have recently been discovered.

Evolution and phylogeny 
The first thaumastocyonines appear during the earliest Miocene epoch in the form of Crassidia intermedia, which was already the largest predator in its habitat. However, they diversified following the major faunal and climatic changes of the Orleanian. The replacement of Western Europe's arid landscape with wet environments, combined with the dispersal of African and Asian taxa into Europe, lead to a reconstruction of the local faunal community. As a result, the Haplocyoninae disappeared from Europe, while their close relatives, the thaumastocyonines and amphicyonines, flourished. The Thaumastocyoninae reached their peak diversity during MN9 stage of the Vallesian, but they disappeared soon after. One possible explanation are the effects of the Vallesian Crisis, a major local extinction event as a result of the reduction of forests in favor of open habitats, which reshaped Europe's fauna. Among thaumastocyonines, only Ammitocyon is known after this event.

Below is a cladogram based on cranial, mandibular and dental characters, after Morales et al., 2021, showing the phylogenetic relationships between the species of the subfamily:

Classification

References 

Fossil taxa described in 1940
Miocene Europe
Prehistoric carnivorans of Europe
Bear dogs
Mammal subfamilies